Sara Tomko is a Native American actress and producer known for playing Asta Twelvetrees in Resident Alien and Tiger Lily in Once Upon a Time.

Life and career 
She was born on Wright-Patterson Air Force Base near Dayton, Ohio into a military family and was classically trained as a singer. Tomko attended James Madison University, graduating with a BA in Theatre and Dance.

She is best known for her role as Asta Twelvetrees on SYFY's Resident Alien and Tiger Lily on ABC's Once Upon a Time, her most high-profile roles to date. She is also known for having appeared in S.W.A.T., The Leftovers, Heartbeat, Sneaky Pete (2015), and more. She also appeared in the movies The Terminators (2009), Extracted (2012), 400 Days (2015), and Suicide for Beginners (2022).

She is engaged to director TJ Pederson since 2021, who she was dating for five years before that.

Filmography

Film 

 The Terminators (2009)
 Extracted (2012)
 400 Days (2015)
 Suicide for Beginners (2022)

Television 

 Resident Alien - Asta Twelvetrees
 Once Upon a Time - Tiger Lily
 S.W.A.T.
 The Leftovers
 Heartbeat
 Sneaky Pete

References

External links 
 

Living people
21st-century American actresses
1983 births
Native American actresses
Native American filmmakers